Abdul Razak Alim Mohamed Abubucker (born 31 March 1912, date of death unknown) was a Ceylonese politician and Member of Parliament.

Abubucker stood as the United National Party candidate in Mutur at the 1947 parliamentary election. He won the election and entered Parliament. He was defeated by independent M. E. H. Mohammed Ali at the 1952 parliamentary election. He tried to re-enter Parliament at the March 1960 parliamentary election as a Lanka Democratic Party candidate but was again defeated.

References

1912 births
Members of the 1st Parliament of Ceylon
People from Eastern Province, Sri Lanka
People from British Ceylon
Sri Lankan Moor politicians
Sri Lankan Muslims
United National Party politicians
Year of death missing